Ditylus gracilis is a species of false blister beetle in the family Oedemeridae. It is found in North America.

References

Further reading

 

Oedemeridae
Articles created by Qbugbot
Beetles described in 1854